Sulphur Springs is an unincorporated community in Van Buren County, Arkansas, United States.

References

Unincorporated communities in Van Buren County, Arkansas
Unincorporated communities in Arkansas